Lee Shying-jow or Lee Hsiang-chou (born 2 August 1952) is a Taiwanese general and diplomat. He is the incumbent Ambassador to Denmark, and was formerly the 4th Commanding General of the Republic of China Army (ROCA), 8th Deputy Minister of National Defense (MND), the 15th Director-General of the National Security Bureau (NSB) and the 2nd Minister of the Veterans Affairs Council (VAC).

Early life
Lee Hsiang-chou was born in a Military dependents' village of the Republic of China Air Force called the Republican New Village (共和新村) at Donggang, Pingtung, Taiwan, there was his home. His ancestral home was in Xinxiang, Henan

Lee later entered the Republic of China Army Preparatory School right after his completion of junior high school at age 15. He then later graduated from the Republic of China Military Academy in 1974 as a Missile Officer.

Lee also obtained his master's degree from the National Taiwan University, National Chung Hsing University of Taiwan and Georgetown University of the United States.

Military career

Early military position
Lee served as the Commander of Military Police (ROCMP) from 1 June 2009 to 16 May 2011. He was promoted to General of the ROC Army on 16 May 2011 and appointed as the Vice Chief of the General Staff under Admiral Lin Chen-yi, the then Chief of the General Staff.

Army Commanding General
General Lee was appointed to success General Yang Tien-hsiao as the Commanding General of the ROC Army on 16 August 2011.

On 16 July and 8 August 2013, General Lee tendered his resignation from his chief position and from the Ministry of National Defense due to the poor handling of the minister on the death scandal of Corporal Hung Chung-chiu, but was rejected by Defense Minister Kao Hua-chu and Yen Ming. Both Kao and Yen asked him to stay in his post.

Deputy Minister of National Defense
In early April 2014, speaking to the Foreign Affairs and National Defense Committee of the Legislative Yuan, Lee said that if the People's Liberation Army (PLA) were to invade Taiwan, they need at least four months for assault preparation, thus translated to the amount of advance warning Taiwan needs in such scenario. In the event of cross-strait war, the command has to come from Zhongnanhai, the headquarter of the Communist Party of China, by the task force formation at the Central Military Commission. The next step would be recalling all of the Chinese envoys in Taiwan, execute economic preparations and tighten control of Taiwanese business people in Mainland China. He added that Taiwan has already prepared relevant measures with other countries and military reserve would be called in such attack scenario. Military confidence building measure can only be built between ROC Armed Forces and PLA only if Beijing renounces the use of force to achieve Chinese unification. The ROC Ministry of National Defense however would always remain neutral in any cross-strait issues, he added.

Political career

Veterans minister for the Tsai Administration
On 28 April 2016, Lee Hsiang-chou was designated to be the new Minister of the Veterans Affairs Council. He then took office on 20 May 2016. Prior to assuming the position, Lee registered as a political independent, ending his affiliation with the Kuomintang, which he had joined in 1969.

In December 2016, on his way to visit Thailand from Taiwan, Lee was denied stopover entry into Singapore for the purpose of visiting veterans of the Republic of China Armed Forces residing in the small island nation.

Ambassador to Denmark
Lee left the Veterans Affairs Council in February 2018, and was appointed Taiwan's representative to Denmark that October.

References

External links

1952 births
Living people
National Defense University (Republic of China) alumni
Representatives of Taiwan to Denmark
Republic of China Army generals
Taiwanese Ministers of the Veterans Affairs Council